State Road 567 (NM 567) is a  state highway in the US state of New Mexico. NM 567's western terminus is at U.S. Route 285 (US 285) south of Tres Piedras, and the eastern terminus is at NM 570 north of Pilar, at the Taos Junction Bridge over the Rio Grande. The junction at US 285 is known as Taos Junction.

Major intersections

See also

References

567
Transportation in Taos County, New Mexico